Charles Muir is a tantra teacher described as "one of the originators of the modern tantra movement" in the United States. He has taught tantra since the 1980s under the title "The Art of Conscious Loving". His first book was Tantra: The Art of Conscious Loving (1989). He developed the method "sacred spot massage". In addition to Red Tantra practices ("sex is part of Tantra"), Charles teaches a method of White Tantra ("sex is bad"), which is the grandfather of Hatha Yoga, with extended holds, meditation, and chakra focus. He has trained a few hundred Certified Tantric Educators (CTEs).

He is Director of the Source School of Tantra Yoga and plans to retire in 2020, after his 4th and final "Meeting of the Masters" Thailand retreat, co-taught with Taoist Grandmaster Mantak Chia, at Tao Garden in Chiang Mai, Thailand.

References

 (Database: Gale General OneFile)
 (Database: Ebsco MasterFile Complete)
 (Database: Ebsco MasterFile Complete)
Katy Butler (May 1, 1994). "Sex in the 90s Places Spirit Above Body", San Francisco Chronicle. Quote: "The techniques the Muirs call New Age tantra are loosely derived from an underground meditative tradition that flourished in India about 500 A.D." (Database: Ebsco MasterFile Complete)

External links
Samsara, la rueda del destino, libro gratuito que enfatiza el uso exclusivo del bhakti para obtener moksa del mundo material; publicado en el sitio web Hare Krishna (España).
Liberarse de la rueda de Samsara por el tantra yoga, guia mundial de cursos e instructores de tantra.

Living people
Tantra
Year of birth missing (living people)